General elections were held in Tonga on 27 May 1963.

Electoral system
The Legislative Assembly had seven directly-elected members; three representing Tongatapu and nearby islands, two representing Haʻapai and two representing Vavaʻu and nearby islands. A further seven members were elected by the nobility based on the same constituencies, seven ministers (including the governors of Haʻapai and Vavaʻu) and a Speaker chosen by the monarch, Sālote Tupou III.

Results

References

1963 in Tonga
Tonga
Elections in Tonga
May 1963 events in Oceania